Samuel Hawkes (1816–1903) was an American politician.

Samuel Hawkes may also refer to:
 Samuel Hawkes (missionary), British missionary whose memorial is at the Trinity College Chapel, Cambridge
 Samuel Hawkes (Australian politician), Australian politician who was a Member of the Tasmanian House of Assembly, 1886–1891 and 1891-1893